Thenkarai is a small village near Sholavandan situated 25 km North West of Madurai in Tamil Nadu, India. It is on the banks of River Vaigai. It also called 'Kutti Kerala' because of lot of Coconut trees found on the village.

Villages in Madurai district